George W. Jenkins High School serves Lakeland Highlands, Florida, and Medulla, Florida, the two southernmost unincorporated communities of Lakeland, Florida, a city with a population of 112,641 and a surrounding community of more than 700,000. The school, more commonly known as "George Jenkins" or simply "Jenkins," is part of the Polk County Public Schools system.

It was founded in 1993 and named after George W. Jenkins, founder of Publix, the Lakeland-based supermarket chain. The school was opened to relieve overcrowding at Lakeland High School, Kathleen High School, and Bartow High School. The $25 million campus sits on ninety-five acres in the southeast corner of Lakeland.

The school's mascot is Louie the Eagle and its colors are green and gold.

Students/faculty 

George W. Jenkins High School has 2,291 students and 123 teachers. The school has produced twenty-two National Merit Scholar finalists since its second operating year, 1994.  The school year is divided into two, eighteen-week semesters. Each student attends four classes each Wednesday and Thursday, And seven classes Monday, Tuesday and Friday.

National test scores 

SAT Scores (218 Students, 2006–2007)

ACT Scores (153 Students, 2006–2007)

Athletics 
George Jenkins offers students more than 18 sports during Fall, Spring and Winter. Some of the school's sports offerings include football, baseball, basketball, tennis, golf, cross country/track, boys soccer, wrestling, swimming and volleyball.

George Jenkins has won two state titles in its school history, one in 1998 by the Boys Tennis team and the other one by the Girls Soccer team on February 13, 2008. The soccer team defeated Satellite High School to capture the Class 5A State Championship. George Jenkins is represented by its Dream Maker band at all large sporting activities. Also, George Jenkins is represented by the ensemble Golden Harmony, who sings the National Anthem at most sporting activities.

Notable alumni 
Lance Niekro, 1997 GJHS graduate. Major League Baseball player with the San Francisco Giants. Son of MLB 221 games winning knuckleballer pitcher Joe Niekro.
Chris Fontaine, 2000 graduate, NASCAR driver.

Administration 

The school's principal is Tom Patton, a former administrator at the school. George Jenkins' administrative staff also consists of two assistant principals and five deans (of academics, athletics, attendance, and two of students).

Lake Region High School, in Winter Haven, FL, is modeled after George Jenkins.

2006 State of Florida Academic FCAT Performance Grade: B

2006 State of Florida Academic "Adequate Yearly Progress": Yes

References

Schools in Lakeland, Florida
High schools in Polk County, Florida
Public high schools in Florida
1993 establishments in Florida
Educational institutions established in 1993